Agyrta chena is a moth of the subfamily Arctiinae. It was described by Herbert Druce in 1893. It is found in the Upper Amazon region and Bolivia.

References

Moths described in 1893
Arctiinae of South America
Fauna of Bolivia